Artem Sitak and Leonardo Tavares won in the final, 4–6, 6–4, [10–8] against Harsh Mankad and Izak van der Merwe.

Seeds

Draw

Draw

References
 Main Draw
 Qualifying Draw

Weil Tennis Academy Challenger - Doubles